Lucas da Silva Rocha (born 19 June 1995), known as Lucas Rocha, is a Brazilian footballer who plays for Muangthong United as a centre back.

Career statistics

References

External links

1995 births
Living people
Brazilian footballers
Association football defenders
Campeonato Brasileiro Série A players
Campeonato Brasileiro Série B players
Associação Desportiva Confiança players
Clube Atlético Bragantino players
Boavista Sport Club players
CR Vasco da Gama players
Atlético Clube Goianiense players
Lucas Rocha